Mehmet Sarı (born 29 January 1948) is a Turkish wrestler. He competed in the men's freestyle 68 kg at the 1976 Summer Olympics.

References

External links
 

1948 births
Living people
Turkish male sport wrestlers
Olympic wrestlers of Turkey
Wrestlers at the 1976 Summer Olympics
People from Tarsus, Mersin